Warrior Creek may refer to:

 Warrior Creek (Georgia)
 Warrior Creek (Pennsylvania)

See also
 Warrior Run (disambiguation)